The Gornaya Shoria megaliths, meaning Mount Shoria megaliths, are rock formations forming part of Mount Shoriya (Gornaya Shoria) in southern Siberia, Russia, lying to the east of the Altay Mountains. 

Fringe articles have claimed these rock formations are gigantic prehistoric man-made blocks, or megaliths. It is reported that the largest pieces or blocks of stone have estimated weights between three and four thousand tons, which would make them larger than the megaliths at Baalbek, in Lebanon. Both tectonic forces acting on deeply buried bedrock and pressure release that occurs within nearsurface bedrock as it is uplifted and eroded commonly form rectangular, block-like, rock formations that consist of jointed rock. Tectonic forces acting on deeply buried massive bedrock, such as granite, and pressure release as this bedrock is uncovered by erosion, can create sets of joints which are known as orthogonal joint sets, that intersect at nearly 90 degrees. Orthogonal joint sets quite often result in the formation of rock formations that are comparable in size and shape to the blocks shown in pictures of the alleged megaliths.

It is quite common for spheroidal weathering, a form of chemical weathering, to occur as groundwater circulates through orthogonal joint sets in the near-surface. This process results in the alteration and disintegration of bedrock adjacent to the joints. The preferential removal of weathered bedrock by erosion creates often creates bedrock blocks, which are called corestones. These bedrock blocks commonly have rounded corners and are separated from each other by cracks of variable size. Such corestones form both hills and mountains composed of exposed and rectangular blocks of jointed bedrock that are comparable to the rock formations found in the Mountain Shoriya. These hills and mountains are known as either tors or koppies.

Notes

Shoria
Landforms of Kemerovo Oblast